"Where Do Broken Hearts Go" may refer to:

"Where Do Broken Hearts Go", 1988 single from Whitney Houston's second album Whitney. 
"Where Do Broken Hearts Go (One Direction song), 2014 promotional single by One Direction from their album Four